The 1996–97 Kent Football League season was the 31st in the history of the Kent Football League, a football competition in England.

The league was won by Herne Bay for the third time during the 1990s.

League table

The league featured 19 clubs which competed in the previous season, along with two new clubs:
Lordswood, joined from the Kent County League
Woolwich Town, transferred from the Spartan League

League table

References

External links

1996-97
1996–97 in English football leagues